The Little Unicorn is a 2001 South African direct-to-video fantasy adventure film written, co-produced and directed by Paul Matthews.

Plot
Polly Regan and her grandfather have to rescue a little unicorn when it's captured by a circus' owners.

Cast
 Brittney Bomann as Polly Regan
 Byron Taylor as Toby Cooper
 Emma Samms as Lucy Regan
 David Warner as Ted Regan
 Mick Walter as Mighty
 Joe Penny as Tiny
 George Hamilton as The Great Allonso
 Christopher Atkins as PC Sid Edwards

Reception
Vince Leo from Qwipster's Movie Reviews gave the film one and a half out of five stars. He was critical about the movie and failed to find any good aspect in its production. He stated: "Unless you are a young child who is obsessed with unicorns, there is just nothing here at all to recommend. The Little Unicorn is as derivative as they come, with an undercurrent of ugliness that seems out-of-place in what should be a heartwarming tale. It's dreadfully boring and noisy, and about the longest 80 minutes you could spend doing just about anything. Writer-director Paul Matthews followed this up with another similar film, The Last Leprechaun, with much of the same cast. I'll probably never review it, since I've already dubbed Unicorn with the alternate title, 'THE LAST PAUL MATTHEWS FILM I'LL EVER SEE.'"

In 2017, RiffTrax released a downloadable version of The Little Unicorn with a comedic commentary track.

References

External links
 
 

2001 direct-to-video films
2001 films
2000s fantasy adventure films
Films about unicorns
South African adventure films
English-language South African films
2000s English-language films
Films directed by Paul Matthews